Vellam is a 2021 Indian Malayalam-language biographical drama film written and directed by Prajesh Sen. It features Jayasurya and Samyuktha Menon in lead roles with Siddique, Sreelakshmi, Santhosh Keezhattoor, Johny Antony in other supporting roles.

The film is based on the life of a Kerala-born businessman Murali Kunnumpurath who turned his life from a full time alcoholic to a successful businessman. The film was released on 22 January 2021. The music was composed by Bijibal.

Plot
Murali Nambiar is an alcoholic who becomes a burden for his family and the society around him. His family life comes under strain and his wife and parents watch helpless his decline. He even takes money and valuables from his home and his friends to buy alcohol, upsetting those close to him. He is even shown selling the furniture from his home once. After getting drunk, he often ends up sleeping on sidewalks and shop fronts. Once he is accused of stealing a golden ring at an engagement but this proves to be wrong. He makes a scene at his friend's funeral because of some misunderstanding. Although he is often seen as a drunkard by his family and neighbors, a few people still talk about his cool demeanor and hardworking nature.

One day he talks about his addiction with one of his friends who takes him to a de-addiction center where Dr. Subhramaniyam is the chief doctor. Dr. Subhramaniyam takes Murali under his wing, offering to treat his addiction. But Murali slacks off and continues to drink. The doctor contacts Murali's wife who has left him earlier because of his excessive drinking and tells her that Murali needs love and care as part of the treatment.

After the treatment he returns to his homeplace where his friends continue to treat him as before, a drunkard. Murali gets back to his home and finds that his parents have sold their house and moved on. Seeing that no one is concerned about him, he jumps into a well to kill himself. But he is rescued and rushed to hospital. When Dr. Subhramaniyam learns of this, he convinces Murali's family that he requires love and support.

Murali then slowly becomes a successful entrepreneur and launches a product called "Waterman" tiles and even starts exporting them. The movie ends with Murali bringing another drunkard to Dr. Subhramaniyam for treatment, convinced that he too can reform, just like he has.

Cast

Production 
In February 2019, Jayasurya announced that he and Prajesh Sen are collaborating again after Captain (2018). Announcing the title of the film, Jayasurya said that the character in Vellam is his toughest character in his career to date. Vellam was produced by Friendly Productions. Title carries the tagline "The Essential Drink". Production of the film started in November 2019.

Music 
All the music tracks were composed by Bijibal and lyrics are penned by B.K Harinarayanan and Nidheesh Nadery.

Release
Vellam was going for a theatrical release but was postponed indefinitely due to closures of theatres. The producers were planning to go ahead for a direct-to-streaming release but held it. Then it was announced that the film would release on 22 January 2021. In April 2021 the film started streaming on Sun NXT.

Awards, nominations and recognitions

51st Kerala State film awards
Best Actor - Jayasurya
Best Male Playback Singer-Shahabaz Aman

Kerala Film Critics Association Awards
 Second Best Director-Prajesh Sen
2021 : The Vellam movie selected as the second best movie by the Kerala Film Critics Association Awards.
2021 : Samyuktha Menon bagged the Kerala Film Critics Association Awards's best actress award for her performance in Vellam movie.

10th South Indian International Movie Awards
 Best Music Director - Bijibal
 Best Debut Producer - Friendly Productions

Prem Nazir Awards
 Best Director-Prajesh Sen
 Best movie - Vellam

Critical response
Upon release the film garnered mostly positive responses. Manorama News'''s reviewer rated the movie 3 out of 5 and said; "Jayasurya's stellar performance is Vellam's highlight, but the film portrays a lofty message. The Times of India gave the film a 4 out of 5. Ashutosh Mohan of Film Companion wrote, "What keeps it watchable, apart from Jayasurya, is the film’s take on alcoholism: it’s a problem but it’s not a vice. A character in the film even says that there’s nothing wrong with alcohol as long as it doesn’t run (and ruin) your life. " Mathrubhumi'' praised Jayasurya's performance. Sidique's dialogue to Jayasurya that "Insult aanu Murali ee lokathile ettavum valya investment, eth thottavaneyum jaippikkunna tuition. Insulted aayittullavane life-il rakshapettittullu" became very popular among the youngsters and family audiences.

Box office
The movie was a box-office bomb as it could collect 2.85 crores on a budget of 6 Crores.

References

External links
 Murali: Real-life inspiration of the movie

2021 films
2020s Malayalam-language films
2020s survival films
2021 drama films